The 1983 College Football All-America team is composed of college football players who were selected as All-Americans by various organizations and writers that chose College Football All-America Teams in 1983. The National Collegiate Athletic Association (NCAA) recognizes five selectors as "official" for the 1983 season. They are: (1) the American Football Coaches Association (AFCA); (2) the Associated Press (AP) selected based on the votes of sports writers at AP newspapers; (3) the Football Writers Association of America (FWAA) selected by the nation's football writers; (4) the United Press International (UPI); and (5) the Walter Camp Football Foundation (WC). Other selectors included Football News (FN), Gannett News Service, the Newspaper Enterprise Association (NEA), and The Sporting News (TSN).

Consensus All-Americans
The following charts identify the NCAA-recognized consensus All-Americans for the year 1983 and displays which first-team designations they received.

Offense

Defense

Special teams

Offense

Receivers 

 Irving Fryar, Nebraska (AFCA, AP-1, FWAA, UPI-1, WC, GNS-1, NEA-1, TSN)
 Gerald McNeil, Baylor (AFCA, AP-1)
 Kenny Jackson, Penn State (AP-2, NEA-1)
 Eric Martin, LSU (GNS-2, TSN)
 Jerry Rice, Mississippi Valley State (GNS-1)
 Brian Brennan, Boston College (AP-2, UPI-2)
 Louis Lipps, Southern Mississippi (GNS-2)
 Eric Richardson, San Jose State (NEA-2)
 Dwight Collins, Pittsburgh (NEA-2)
 Tracy Henderson, Iowa State (AP-3)
 Dave Moritz, Iowa (AP-3)
 Jim Sandusky, San Diego State (FN-3, GNS-3)

Tight ends 

 Gordon Hudson, Brigham Young  (AFCA, AP-1, FWAA, UPI-1, WC, GNS-1, NEA-1)
 Chuck Scott, Vanderbilt (TSN)
 John Frank, Ohio State (GNS-2, NEA-2)
 Glenn Dennison, Miami (FL) (AP-2)
 Paul Bergmann, UCLA (AP-3, UPI-2)

Tackles 

 Bill Fralic, Pittsburgh  (CFHOF) (AFCA, AP-1, FWAA, UPI-1, WC, GNS-1, NEA-1, TSN)
 Terry Long, East Carolina  (AFCA, AP-1 [guard], FWAA, UPI-2 [guard], WC)
 Brian Blados, North Carolina (AP-1, UPI-2, NEA-1)
 Mark Adickes, Baylor (AP-2, GNS-1, TSN)
 Conrad Goode, Missouri (UPI-1)
 Jim Juriga, Illinois (UPI-2, NEA-2)
 Guy McIntyre, Georgia (AP-2)
 Bill Roberts, Ohio State (GNS-2)
 Don Maggs, Tulane (GNS-2)
 Pat Arrington, Auburn (AP-3)
 Scott Raridon, Nebraska (AP-3)

Guards 

 Dean Steinkuhler, Nebraska  (AFCA, AP-2, FWAA, UPI-1, WC, GNS-1, NEA-1, TSN)
 Doug Dawson, Texas (AFCA, AP-1, UPI-2, WC, GNS-2, NEA-2 [tackle])
 Stefan Humphries, Michigan (AP-2, FWAA, UPI-1, GNS-2, NEA-2, TSN)
 Gary Zimmerman, Oregon (AP-3, NEA-1)
 Ron Solt, Maryland (GNS-1, NEA-2)
 James Farr, Clemson (AP-3)

Centers 

 Tony Slaton, USC  (AP-2, FWAA, UPI-1, WC)
 Tom Dixon, Michigan (AFCA, AP-1, TSN)
 Mike Ruether, Texas (UPI-2 [guard], NEA-1)
 Jim Sweeney, Pittsburgh (AP-3, GNS-2)
 Joel Hilgenberg, Iowa (NEA-2)

Quarterbacks 

 Steve Young, Brigham Young  (CFHOF) (AFCA, AP-1, FWAA, UPI-1, WC, GNS-1, NEA-1, TSN)
 Randall Cunningham, UNLV (AFCA [punter], AP-2 [punter], GNS-2)
 Doug Flutie, Boston College (CFHOF) (UPI-2)
 Boomer Esiason, Maryland (NEA-2)
 Turner Gill, Nebraska (AP-2)
 Ben Bennett, Duke (AP-3)

Running backs 

 Mike Rozier, Nebraska (CFHOF)  (AFCA, AP-1, FWAA, UPI-1, WC, GNS-1, NEA-1, TSN)
 Bo Jackson, Auburn (CFHOF) (AFCA, AP-1, FWAA, UPI-1, GNS-1, NEA-1)
 Greg Allen, Florida State  (UPI-1, AP-3, WC, NEA-2)
 Napoleon McCallum, Navy (CFHOF) (AP-2, FWAA, UPI-2, WC, NEA-2, TSN [return specialist])
 Allen Pinkett, Notre Dame (AP-2, UPI-2, GNS-2, TSN)
 Keith Byars, Ohio State (AP-3, UPI-2, GNS-2)

Defense

Defensive ends 

 William Fuller, North Carolina (AFCA, AP-2, UPI-2 [DT], WC, GNS-2, NEA-2, TSN)
 Bruce Smith, Virginia Tech (CFHOF)  (AFCA, AP-2, GNS-1, NEA-1)
 Don Thorp, Illinois (AP-3 [DT], FWAA, UPI-2 [DT], NEA-2, TSN)
 Freddie Gilbert, Georgia (AP-2, UPI-1, GNS-2)
 Ron Faurot, Arkansas (UPI-1)
 Donnie Humphrey, Auburn (UPI-2)
 Jimmie Carter, New Mexico (AP-3)

Defensive tackles 

 Rick Bryan, Oklahoma  (AFCA, AP-1, FWAA, UPI-1, WC, GNS-1, NEA-1, TSN)
 Reggie White, Tennessee (AFCA, AP-1, FWAA, UPI-1, WC, GNS-1, NEA-1, TSN)
 Keith Millard, Washington State (GNS-1)
 Dan Ralph, Oregon (GNS-2)
 Ray Childress, Texas A&M (GNS-2)
 Doug Smith, Auburn (AP-3, NEA-2)

Middle guards 

 William Perry, Clemson (AP-1, FWAA, UPI-1, WC)
 Brian Pillman, Miami (OH) (AP-2)
 Michael Carter, SMU (AP-3, UPI-2)

Linebackers 

 Ricky Hunley, Arizona (CFHOF)  (AFCA, AP-1, FWAA, UPI-1, WC, GNS-2, NEA-1)
 Wilber Marshall, Florida (CFHOF) (AFCA, AP-1, UPI-1, WC, NEA-1)
 Ron Rivera, California (AFCA, AP-1, FWAA, UPI-2, GNS-1, NEA-1 TSN)
 Jeff Leiding, Texas (AP-1, FWAA, UPI-2, WC)
 Carl Banks, Michigan State (AP-1, UPI-1, GNS-1, NEA-1, TSN)
 Vaughan Johnson, North Carolina State (AP-2, TSN)
 Jay Brophy, Miami (Fla.) (AP-3, UPI-2, FN, NEA-2)
 Jack Del Rio, USC (AP-3, GNS-1, NEA-2)
 Kevin Murphy, Oklahoma (AP-2, UPI-2 [DE], GNS-2)
 Gregg Carr, Auburn (AP-2)
 Steve DeOssie, Boston College (AP-2)
 Mike Knox, Nebraska (GNS-2)
 Jim Dumont, Rutgers (AP-3)
 Andy Ponseigo, Navy (AP-3)

Defensive backs 

 Don Rogers, UCLA (AFCA, AP-2, FWAA, UPI-2, WC, GNS-1, TSN, NEA-2)
 Jerry Gray, Texas (CFHOF) (AFCA, AP-1, FWAA, UPI-1, GNS-1, NEA-1)
 Russell Carter, SMU (AFCA, AP-1, FWAA, UPI-1, WC, GNS-1, NEA-1, TSN)
 Terry Hoage, Georgia (CFHOF) (AFCA, FWAA, UPI-1, WC, GNS-2, NEA-1, TSN)
 Mossy Cade, Texas (AP-1, UPI-2, WC, GNS-2, TSN, NEA-2)
 Leonard Coleman, Vanderbilt (AP-3, GNS-1, NEA-2)
 Craig Swoope, Illinois (AP-2, UPI-2, NEA-1)
 Victor Scott, Colorado (AP-2)
 David Fulcher, Arizona State (GNS-2)
 Randy Robbins, Arizona (GNS-2)
 Martin Bayless, Bowling Green (AP-3)
 Harry Hamilton, Penn State (AP-3)

Special teams

Kickers 

 Luis Zendejas, Arizona State  (AP-1, FWAA, WC, GNS-2, NEA-1)
 Bruce Kallmeyer, Kansas (AFCA, AP-2, UPI-1, GNS-1)
 Paul Woodside, West Virginia (UPI-2, TSN)
 Tony Zendejas, Nevada (Reno) (NEA-2)
 Jeff Ward, Texas (AP-3)

Punters 

 Jack Weil, Wyoming (AP-1, FWAA, UPI-1, NEA-2)
 Jim Colquitt, Tennessee (WC, NEA-1)
 Randall Cunningham, UNLV (AFCA, AP-2)
 Ralf Mojsiejenko, Michigan State (GNS-1, TSN)
 John Kidd, Northwestern (GNS-2)
 John Teltschik, Texas (UPI-2)

Returners 

 Napoleon McCallum, Navy (TSN)

Key 

 Bold – Consensus All-American
 -1 – First-team selection
 -2 – Second-team selection
 -3 – Third-team selection
 CFHOF = College Football Hall of Fame inductee

Official selectors

 AFCA – American Football Coaches Association, aka the Kodak-AFCA Team
 AP – Associated Press
 FWAA – Football Writers Association of America
 UPI – United Press International
 WC – Walter Camp Football Foundation

Other selectors

 FN – Football News
 GNS – Gannett News Service
 NEA – Newspaper Enterprise Association
 TSN – The Sporting News

See also
 1983 All-Big Eight Conference football team
 1983 All-Big Ten Conference football team
 1983 All-Pacific-10 Conference football team
 1983 All-SEC football team

References 

All-America Team
College Football All-America Teams